The Elapoidea are a superfamily of snakes in the clade Colubroides, traditionally comprising the families Lamprophiidae and Elapidae. Advanced genomic sequence studies, however, have found lamprophiids to be paraphyletic in respect to elapids. In describing the subfamily Cyclocorinae, Weinell et al. (2017) suggested some or all subfamilies of Lamprophiidae should be reevaluated at full family status as a way to prevent the alternative, which is classifying them as elapids. This was followed in later studies such as Zaher et al. (2019). 

The Reptile Database considers Elapoidea to be synonymous with its sister group Colubroidea (in contrast to other studies that distinguish between both), as it does not recognize the division of Colubridae into multiple families that comprise Colubroidea, and thus instead considers Colubroidea to be composed of Colubridae + the multiple families comprising Elapoidea.

Below is the phylogeny of Elapoidea after Weinell et al. (2017), with the interrelations of Elapid after Lee et al. (2016) and Figueroa et al. (2016):

Below is a phylogeny of Elapoidea after Zaher et al. (2019).

Families and subfamilies:

 Family: Cyclocoridae Weinell & Brown, 2017—Philippine snakes
 Family: Elapidae F. Boie, 1827—Cobras, coral snakes, mambas, taipans, sea snakes, and others
 Calliophiinae
 Micrurinae
 Najinae
 Bungarinae
 Hydrophiinae Fitzinger, 1843
 Family: Pseudaspididae Cope, 1893—mole snake, western keeled snake, and mock vipers
 Family: Prosymnidae Gray, 1849—shovel-snouted snakes
 Family: Psammophiidae Bourgeois, 1968—sand snakes and allies
 Family: Micrelapidae, 2023
 Family: Atractaspididae Günther, 1858—African burrowing asps, stiletto snakes, harlequin snakes
 Atractaspidinae Günther, 1858
 Aparallactinae Bourgeois, 1968
 Family: Pseudoxyrhophiidae Dowling, 1975—Malagasy hognose snakes, brook snakes, and allies
 Amplorhininae Meirte, 1992
 Pseudoxyrhophiinae Dowling, 1975
 Family: Lamprophiidae Fitzinger, 1843—lamprophiids

Notes

References

Alethinophidia